Nikolai Dmitrievich Kashirin (Russian: Николай Дмитриевич Каширин; 16 February 1888 – 14 June 1938) was a Soviet Komandarm 2nd rank. He fought for the Imperial Russian Army in World War I, receiving the Order of Saint Vladimir and the Order of Saint Anna. He was a recipient of the Order of the Red Banner. He was one of the judges at the trial of Marshal of the Soviet Union Mikhail Tukhachevsky in the Case of Trotskyist Anti-Soviet Military Organization in June 1937. Kashirin was himself arrested on 19 August 1937 and later executed. His younger brother, Ivan, was arrested on 20/21 June 1937 and executed on 20 September 1937.

Bibliography 
 Краснознамённый Киевский. Очерки истории Краснознамённого Киевского военного округа (1919–1979). Издание второе, исправленное и дополненное. Киев, издательство политической литературы Украины. 1979.
 Апрелков А.В. Командарм 2-го ранга Н.Д. Каширин//«Военно-исторический журнал», 1988, № 2. - Стр.48-52.

External links
 Семья Кашириных
 Каширин Николай Дмитриевич. Биография
 Каширин Николай Дмитриевич. Уральская историческая энциклопедия. 
 Глава «Отпор» из книги «Революция защищается»
 Николай Каширин в списке лиц награждённых Орденом Красного Знамени (РСФСР) и почётным революционным оружием

 http://rkka.ru/cavalry/30/007_kd.html 7 кавалерийская Самарская Краснознаменная дивизия имени Английского пролетариата (1с)
 Акулинин И. Г. Оренбургское казачье войско в борьбе с большевиками

1888 births
1938 deaths
Russian military personnel of World War I
Soviet military personnel of the Russian Civil War
Soviet komandarms of the second rank
Recipients of the Order of the Red Banner
Recipients of the Order of St. Vladimir
Recipients of the Order of St. Anna
Great Purge perpetrators
Great Purge victims from Russia